Kyaw Htet Aung (born 14 September 1985) is a Burmese television host, MC, actor and model. He is best known for hosting in the televised singing competition show Myanmar Idol, which propelled him to fame in Myanmar.

Early life and education
Kyaw Htet Aung was born on 14 September 1985 in Yangon, Myanmar to parent Win Lwin and Myint Myint Oo. He graduated from East Yangon University. He studied acting at Talents & Models Agency in 2000.

Career

MC and host
Kyaw began his career as a presenter in 2007. He is the second generation of the young TV presenters and worked as a host for Family Entertainment from 2010 to 2014. After that, he started as a freelance model and MC. He has been a TV host for many talk show programs and received acceptance of audience for famous reality show Myanmar Idol. He served as the TV host for Myanmar Motion Picture Academy Awards Ceremony in 2016 and 2017 and also hosted the Miss Universe Myanmar 2018.

Acting career
Kyaw entered the entertainment industry, he has been practicing dance choreography on a regular basis. He is set to star in a short film project, sponsored by Myanmar Brewery. As he would play the role of a dancer for the first time, he is now practicing dance moves with the Secret Pieces Dance Crew. Rising to fame in 2016, he became a professional actor. He made his acting debut with a supporting role in 2016 big screen film Kyat Gu (Coffin Cave), directed by Lu Min, which screened in Myanmar cinemas in 2018. Soon after, he signed under Aung Khit Minn Film Production.

Later, he took on his first big-screen lead role in the drama film Thu Nge, alongside Yan Aung, Ye Aung, Min Oo, Soe Myat Thuzar, Htun Eaindra Bo, Khine Thin Kyi and Mari Ko, directed by Arr Yone Oo Pwint Thingi Zaw, and which screened in Myanmar cinemas on 23 June 2017. The same year, he portrayed his role as Nyein Chan in his 2nd big-screen film Nay Chi Mhar Shwe Yi Laung, where he played the leading role with Aye Myat Thu and Nan Myat Phyo Than, directed by Zaw Myint Oo, and which screened in Myanmar cinemas on 15 September 2017. The film was nominated "Best Actor" for Kyaw Htet Aung at the Myanmar Academy Awards 2017.

In 2018, Kyaw portrayed the military doctor in the military figures series Sit Ko Mone Ywae Tite Khae Ti, was base on the true story and which aired on Myawaddy Channel on 25 March 2018. In the same year, he starred the leading role in big-screen film Za Yike, alongside Lu Min, Khine Thin Kyi and Htun Eaindra Bo, which screened in Myanmar cinemas on 30 May 2019. He then starred in the big-screen film Carbon Dioxide, alongside A Linn Yaung, Phway Phway and Yadabar Bo, directed by Wyne, which screened in Myanmar cinemas on 27 July 2018. 

He also starred in the big-screen film Chu Si, where he played the leading role with Melody, Ei Chaw Po, Aye Myat Thu, May and Nan Su Oo, which premiered in Myanmar cinemas on 14 September 2018. He was cast in the big-screen film The Masks on 6 May 2018.

Brand ambassadorships
Kyaw Htet Aung was appointed as brand ambassador for Red Bull and Nescafé in 2017 and also brand ambassador of Nutrivita in 2018.

Filmography

Film (cinema)

Awards and nominations

References

External links

Kyaw Htet Aung on Website

1985 births
Living people
Burmese male film actors
21st-century Burmese male actors
Masters of ceremonies
Burmese television presenters
Burmese male models
People from Yangon